Naraka Chaturdashi (also known as Kali Chaudas, Narak Chaudas, Roop Chaudas, Choti Diwali, Narak Nivaran Chaturdashi or Bhoot Chaturdashi) is an annual Hindu festival that falls on Chaturdashi (the 14th day) of the Krishna Paksha in the Hindu calendar month of Ashwayuja (according to the amanta tradition) or Kartika (according to the purnimanta tradition). It is the second day of the five-day long festival of Diwali (also known as Deepavali). Hindu literature narrates that the asura (demon) Narakasura was killed on this day by Krishna and Satyabhama. The day is celebrated by early morning religious rituals, and festivities follow on.

Meaning in Hinduism
The festival is also called Kali Chaudas, where Kali means dark (eternal) and Chaudas means fourteenth, since it is celebrated on the 14th day of the lunar month of Kārtika or Krishna Paksha. In some regions of India, Kali Chaudas is the day allotted for the worship of Mahakali or Shakti. Kali Chaudas is the day to abolish laziness and evil, which create hell in our life and shine light on life. The god of death, Yama, is also worshipped on this day by lighting a lamp which is believed to protect one from the sufferings of naraka (hell).

Rituals associated 
The puja is performed with oil, flowers, and sandalwood. Coconuts are also offered to Lord Hanuman alongside a prasada of sesame seed, jaggery and rice flakes (poha) with ghee and sugar.

The rituals of Kali Chaudas are strongly suggestive of the origin of Diwali as a harvest festival. On this day, delicacies are prepared from pounded semi-cooked rice (called Poha or Pova). This rice is taken from the fresh harvest available at that time. This custom is prevalent both in rural and urban areas, especially in Western India.

On this day, a head wash and application of kajal in the eyes is believed to keep away the kali nazar (evil eye). Some say that those who are into tantra learn their mantras on this day. Alternatively, people offer Nivet is local to where they are originally from. This goddess is called their Kula Devi, in order to cast off evil spirits. Some families also offer food to their ancestors on this day. The second day of Deepavali is known as Kali Chaudas in Rajasthan and Gujarat.

On this day, Hindus get up earlier than usual. The men will rub their bodies in perfumed oils before bathing. Afterwards, clean clothes are worn. A large breakfast is enjoyed with relatives and friends. In the evening, a mix of bright and loud fireworks are set off in an atmosphere of joyful fun and noise. Special sweet dishes are served as part of the midday meal. Houses are lit with oil lamps during the evening.

In Goa, paper-made effigies of Narakasura, filled with grass and firecrackers symbolising evil, are made. These effigies are burnt at around four o'clock in the morning, firecrackers are burst, and people return home to take a scented oil bath. Lamps are lit in a line. The women of the house perform aarti for the men, gifts are exchanged, a bitter berry called kareet is crushed under the feet in token of killing Narakasura, symbolising the removal of evil and ignorance. Different varieties of poha and sweets are made and eaten with family and friends.

In the state of West Bengal, the day before the Kali Puja is observed as Bhoot Chaturdashi.  It is believed on the eve of this dark night, the souls of the deceased come down to earth to visit their dear ones. It is also believed that the 14 forefathers of a family visit their living relatives, and so 14 diyas are placed all around the house to guide them homewards and especially to chase away the evil ones. Every dark corner and nook are illuminated with light. Abhyanga Snan on Narak Chaturdashi day holds a special significance in a person's life. Abhyanga Snan is always done during the presence of moon but before sunrise while Chaturdashi Tithi is prevailing. This snan is done using ubtan of sesame (til) oil. Snan done with this ubtan helps protect the persons from poverty, unforeseen events, misfortune, etc.

In Tamil Nadu, Deepavali is traditionally celebrated on Naraka Chathurdasi day, while the rest of India celebrates it on the new moon night (Amavasya), which is the next day. In some parts of South India, this is also called Deepavali Bhogi. People get up earlier and celebrate with oil baths, aarti, pooja, and festivals. Firecrackers are usually lit on Deepavali. Some Tamil homes observe nombu and do Lakshmi Puja on this day. In Karnataka, the festival of Deepavali starts from this day i.e., Naraka Chathurdashi with early morning traditional oil bath, aarti followed by bursting firecrackers and extends till Bali Padyami, which is the main day of Deepavali celebration, when cows are decorated and worshipped.

References

External links
 Kali Chaudas Page on Diwali Festival website

Diwali
Religious festivals in India
October observances
November observances
Hindu holy days
Hindu festivals
Hindu festivals in India
Hindu festivals in Nepal